Silvina ("Silvia") Corvalán Mayoral (born October 15, 1973) is a retired female field hockey defender from Argentina. She was a member of the Women's National Team that competed at the 1996 Summer Olympics, after having won the gold medal the previous year at the 1995 Pan American Games.

References 
  sports-reference
  santafe de portivo

External links
 

1974 births
Living people
Argentine female field hockey players
Las Leonas players
Field hockey players at the 1996 Summer Olympics
Olympic field hockey players of Argentina
Pan American Games gold medalists for Argentina
Pan American Games medalists in field hockey
Field hockey players at the 1995 Pan American Games
Field hockey players at the 1999 Pan American Games
Medalists at the 1995 Pan American Games
Medalists at the 1999 Pan American Games